The Men's 200 Individual Medley (or "I.M.") at the 10th FINA World Swimming Championships (25m) was swum on 17 December 2010 in Dubai, United Arab Emirates. 57 individuals swam in the Preliminary heats in the morning, from which the top-8 finishers advanced to swim again in the Final that evening.

At the start of the event, the existing World (WR) and Championship records (CR) were:

The following records were established during the competition:

Results

Heats

Final

References

Individual medley 200 metre, Men's
World Short Course Swimming Championships